= Speed limits in Ukraine =

The general speed limits in Ukraine are as follows:

- within residential areas: 20 km/h (12 mph)
- in populated localities: 50 km/h (31 mph) The localities are designated by road signs with town/city name on white-color background; they might not exactly coincide with legal city boundaries. Road signs with village/town names on blue-color background do not override rural road's speed limit.
- outside populated localities: 90 km/h (56 mph) except the following:
  - for mopeds, cargo vehicles carrying humans in a cargo bed: 60 km/h (37 mph)
  - for drivers with less than 2 years of experience: 70 km/h (43 mph)
  - for motorcycles, cars with a trailer, buses carrying children: 80 km/h (50 mph)
  - for heavy goods vehicles >3,5t: 90 km/h (56 mph)
  - for buses (but not for minibuses): 90 km/h (56 mph)
  - for all other vehicles on dual carriageways: 110 km/h (68 mph)
  - for all other vehicles on motorways: 130 km/h (81 mph)
- for car towing: 50 km/h (31 mph)
